Chrisley Knows Best is an American reality television series that premiered on the USA Network on March 11, 2014. It revolves around the lives of Georgia real estate tycoon Todd Chrisley and his wealthy family. The show was filmed in Roswell and Alpharetta, suburbs of Atlanta, before moving primarily to Nashville during the fourth season. In June 2022, Todd Chrisley and his wife Julie Chrisley were found guilty on federal charges of bank fraud and tax evasion and submitting false documents to banks to take out loans and fund their lavish lifestyle. In November 2022, the couple was sentenced to a combined 19 years in prison.

Series overview

Episodes

Season 1 (2014)

Season 2 (2014)

Season 3 (2015)

Season 4 (2016)

Season 5 (2017)

Season 6 (2018)

Season 7 (2019)

Specials (2019–20)

Season 8 (2020–21)

Season 9 (2021–22)

Season 10 (2023)

References

Lists of American reality television series episodes